Mohamed Ali El Hammi (15 October 1890 – May 10, 1928) was born in El Hamma, Gabès and died in Saudi Arabia.

He was born in El Hamma but moved to Tunis at age 8 when his mother died. He began his professional life as a personal driver for the Hungarian consul in Tunis. He also worked as a porter before obtaining his driving license in 1908. He then left for Germany and studied economics and political science at the University of Berlin. He founded the Confédération générale des travailleurs tunisiens (General Confederation of Tunisian Workers) in 1924 He was a friend and contemporary of Tahar Haddad.

Death 
On May 10, 1928, he died in a mysterious car crash in Saudi Arabia and his remains were repatriated to Tunisia on April 6, 1968. He is deemed as the father of Tunisian syndicalism.

References

1890 births
1928 deaths
Tunisian activists